Željko Franulović defeated Manuel Orantes 6–4, 6–2, 6–0 to win the 1970 ATP Buenos Aires singles competition. François Jauffret was the champion but did not defend his title.

Draw

Final

Section 1

Section 2

External links
 1970 ATP Buenos Aires Singles draw

Singles